The 1997 Fed Cup was the 35th edition of the most important competition between national teams in women's tennis. The final took place at Brabant Hall in 's-Hertogenbosch in the Netherlands on 4–5 October, with France defeating the Netherlands to win their first title.

World Group

Draw

World Group play-offs

The four losing teams in the World Group first round ties (Germany, Japan, Spain and United States), and four winners of the World Group II ties (Argentina, Australia, Croatia and Switzerland) entered the draw for the World Group play-offs.

Date: 12–13 July

World Group II

The World Group II was the second highest level of Fed Cup competition in 1997. Winners advanced to the World Group play-offs, and loser played in the World Group II play-offs.

Date: 1–2 March

World Group II play-offs

The four losing teams from World Group II (Austria, Slovakia, South Africa and South Korea) played off against qualifiers from Zonal Group I. Two teams qualified from Europe/Africa Zone (Italy and Russia), one team from the Asia/Oceania Zone (Indonesia), and one team from the Americas Zone (Canada).

Date: 12–13 July

Americas Zone

 Nations in bold advanced to the higher level of competition.
 Nations in italics were relegated down to a lower level of competition.

Group I
Venue: Colombian Tennis Academy, Bogotá, Colombia (outdoor clay)

Dates: 29 April – 4 May

Participating Teams

Group II
Venue: Casa de Campo, San Domingo, Dominican Republic (outdoor clay)

Dates: 12–18 May

Participating Teams

Asia/Oceania Zone

 Nations in bold advanced to the higher level of competition.
 Nations in italics were relegated down to a lower level of competition.

Group I
Venue: Renouf Centre, Wellington, New Zealand (outdoor hard)

Dates: 11–15 March

Participating Teams

Group II
Venue: Renouf Centre, Wellington, New Zealand (outdoor hard)

Dates: 11–15 March

Participating Teams

 
 Pacific Oceania

Europe/Africa Zone

 Nations in bold advanced to the higher level of competition.
 Nations in italics were relegated down to a lower level of competition.

Group I 
Venue: Bari T.C., Bari, Italy (outdoor clay)

Dates: 22–26 April

Participating Teams

Group II
Venue: Ali Bey Club, Manavgat, Turkey (outdoor clay)

Dates: 5–11 May

Participating Teams

External links 
 Fed Cup

 
Billie Jean King Cups by year
Fed Cup
1997 in women's tennis
Sports competitions in 's-Hertogenbosch